West Philadelphia High School is a secondary school located in the West Philadelphia section of Philadelphia, Pennsylvania at the intersection of 49th Street and Chestnut Street.

History
The original West Philadelphia High School (WPHS) building opened in 1912 as Philadelphia's first secondary school west of the Schuylkill, occupying an entire city block bounded by 47th Street, 48th Street, Walnut Street and Locust Street. The student population at that time was in excess of 5,500. Such was the press on the new high school, which originally stood as two separate buildings for boys and girls, that the City was compelled to open Overbrook High School in 1926. A third high school, John Bartram, followed in 1935.

The building was added to the National Register of Historic Places in 1986.

WPHS's athletic field, which is located at 48th and Spruce Street, was formerly known as Passon Field and home to Negro league baseball in the 1930s. It was the home field of the Eastern Colored League's Philadelphia Bacharach Giants starting in 1931, and the Negro National League's Philadelphia Stars in 1934 and 1935. In 1936 the Stars moved to Penmar Park at 44th and Parkside, where they played the majority of their home games through their final season in 1952.  The field is still in use by West Philadelphia High School's football and baseball teams.

In September 2011, the school moved to a new building at its current building at 49th & Chestnut Streets. The new building is much smaller due to reduced enrollment at the high school. The former building at 47th Street & Walnut Street was converted into housing as the West Lofts, for about 268 apartments.

In June 2013, the school district allowed the Sustainability Workshop to take all of the space in the auto mechanic building, prompting community opposition.

In November 2016, the water from some faucets at the high school was found to be discolored, and was declared unsafe by school officials the following month.

Small learning communities
 AUTO: Automotive Academy
 B&T: Business and Technology
 UL: Urban Leadership
 9: Ninth Grade Success Academy
 CAPA: Creative & Performing Arts

Sports programs & extracurricular activities
 Cheerleading Squad 
 Dance Club
 Musicals
 Choir
 Volleyball
 Baseball
 Boys Basketball - 1977 National Champions
 Girls Basketball
 Football
 Track

Notable alumni
Gene Banks - NBA Player
Tyrell Biggs - 1984 Olympic Heavyweight Boxing Champion
John McDermott - first American winner of the U.S. Open golf tournament.
Anne Rudin - Former Sacramento mayor 
 Ray Scott (basketball)- NBA & ABA Player, NBA Coach
 Art Spector (1920–1987) - Boston Celtics basketball player
 McCoy Tyner - Grammy award-winning Jazz pianist
LeAnna Washington - Pennsylvania State Senator for the 4th district (2005-2014)

References

External links

 
 Public School Insights Story on WPHS

Educational institutions established in 1912
High schools in Philadelphia
School buildings on the National Register of Historic Places in Philadelphia
School District of Philadelphia
Public high schools in Pennsylvania
1912 establishments in Pennsylvania
West Philadelphia